General elections were held in Montserrat in 1940.

Electoral system
The Legislative Council had nine seats; four elected, three held by government officials and two by nominees appointed by the Governor.

References

Elections in Montserrat
Montserrat
1940 in Montserrat
Election and referendum articles with incomplete results